The Hunt was a Canadian rock band, mostly made up of musicians who had been members of another Canadian rock band, Dillinger.

History
In 1977, after Dillinger broke up, guitarist Paul Cockburn, drummer and percussionist Paul Kersey, keyboard player Jacques Harrison, keyboard player and bass guitarist Gerry Mosby, and guitarist and bass guitarist Brian Gagnon performed together as The Hunt. Most members also sang. 

The band released a self-titled album that year through GRT Records in Canada. After this album the band's popularity waned. Mosby left to play bass guitar for the band Rheingold. By 1978, both Harrison and Cockburn had also left.  Guitarist Paul Dickinson was added to the lineup, and the group (now a trio of Dickinson, Gagnon and Kersey) issued a second album, Back on the Hunt.  The album consisted of mainly heavy rock tracks, and was not well received, particularly in the United States.

Carl Calvert played bass guitar on the album Thrill of the Kill in place of Brian Gagnon.   This left drummer Kersey as the only remaining original member.

The song "Little Miss Perfection", from 1977's The Hunt album, received the most radio airplay, primarily in Canada's largest local radio markets, like Toronto and Montreal. 

After having some success in Canada but not much in the U.S., the group disbanded in 1984.

Discography
The Hunt (1977)
Back on the Hunt (1980)
The Thrill of the Kill (1982)

References

Musical groups from Toronto
Canadian progressive rock groups
Musical groups established in 1977
Canadian hard rock musical groups
Musical groups disestablished in 1984
1977 establishments in Ontario
1984 disestablishments in Ontario